Multiverse is the name of professional wrestling events promoted by the U.S. based promotion Impact Wrestling as part of WrestleCon, which is held during the weekend of, and either in or nearby the same city as WrestleMania - the flagship event of WWE - which is considered to be the biggest wrestling event of the year.

The "Multiverse" name stems from Impact either bringing in talent from, or co-producing the show with partner promotions such as New Japan Pro-Wrestling (NJPW), the National Wrestling Alliance (NWA), Ring of Honor (ROH), Game Changer Wrestling (GCW) and Mexico's Lucha Libre AAA Worldwide (AAA).

The following Multiverse events have taken place thus far:

See also
Impact Wrestling vs. Lucha Underground
United We Stand
TNA: There's No Place Like Home
ROH Supercard of Honor

References

Impact Wrestling shows
Professional wrestling joint events